The 2003 Ivy League Baseball Championship Series took place at Bill Clarke Field in Princeton, New Jersey, on May 10 and 11, 2003.  The series matched the regular season champions of each of the league's two divisions.  , the winner of the series, claimed their fourth title and the Ivy League's automatic berth in the 2003 NCAA Division I baseball tournament.  It was Princeton's eighth appearance in the Championship Series, all of which were consecutive.

Harvard made their sixth appearance in the series, and faced Princeton for the sixth time in eight years.  Harvard won in 1997, 1998, 1999, and 2002.

Results

References

Ivy League Baseball Championship Series
Tournament
Ivy League Baseball Championship Series